Mariano Alcides Juan (born 15 May 1976 in Buenos Aires) is a retired Argentine association football player who played in Argentina for River Plate, Racing and Huracán, in the Netherlands for Ajax, and in Spain for Getafe CF, CD Toledo and CD Leganés.

External links
 Argentine Primera statistics

1976 births
Living people
Argentine footballers
Argentina youth international footballers
Argentina under-20 international footballers
Club Atlético River Plate footballers
AFC Ajax players
Racing Club de Avellaneda footballers
Getafe CF footballers
CD Toledo players
Club Atlético Huracán footballers
CD Leganés players
Argentine Primera División players
Eredivisie players
Segunda División B players
Argentine expatriate footballers
Argentine expatriate sportspeople in the Netherlands
Expatriate footballers in the Netherlands
Argentine expatriate sportspeople in Spain
Expatriate footballers in Spain
Association football midfielders
Footballers from Buenos Aires